Finchem is a surname. Notable people with the surname include:

Mark Finchem, American politician
Tim Finchem (born 1947), American lawyer and retired golf administrator

See also
Finchum